The Fast Local Internet Protocol (FLIP) is a communication protocol for LAN and WAN, conceived for distributed applications. FLIP was designed at the Vrije Universiteit Amsterdam to support remote procedure call (RPC) in the Amoeba distributed operating system.

Comparison to TCP/IP
In the OSI model, FLIP occupies the network layer (3), thus replacing IP, but it also obviates the need for a transport layer (4) protocol like TCP.

Properties
FLIP is a connectionless protocol designed to support transparency (with respect to the underlying network layers of the OSI model: 2. data link and 1. physical), efficient RPC, group communication, secure communication and easy network management. The following FLIP properties helps to achieve the requirements of distributed computing:

 FLIP identifies entities with a location-independent 64-bit identifier called Network Service Access Points (NSAPs). An entity can, for example, be a process; contrary to the IP protocol where an IP address identify a host.
 FLIP uses a one way mapping between the “private” address, used to register an endpoint of a network connection, and the “public” address used to advertise the endpoint.
 FLIP routes messages based on NSAP (transparency).
 FLIP discovers routes on demand.
 FLIP uses a bit in the message header to request transmission of sensitive messages across trusted networks.

See also

 IL (network protocol)

References

Internet protocols

ja:Amoeba#Fast Local Internet Protocol